The 2013 European Mixed Curling Championship was held from September 14 to 21 at the Murrayfield Curling Rink in Edinburgh, Scotland. Due to an issue with the ice chilling plant, play was postponed from Saturday night until Sunday night.

Germany's Andy Kapp defeated defending champion Scotland's Ewan MacDonald with a score of 5–4. The game was tied after four ends, but Scotland gave up a steal of two in the sixth end after a draw by MacDonald came up light. Scotland scored two in the seventh end, but Germany were able to get one point in the final end to win the title.

Teams
The teams are listed as follows:

Red Group

Blue Group

Yellow Group

Round-robin standings
Final round-robin standings

Round-robin results
All draw times are listed in Greenwich Mean Time (UTC+0).

Red Group

Sunday, September 15
Draw 1
21:00

Monday, September 16
Draw 2
8:30

Draw 4
16:30

Tuesday, September 17
Draw 6
8:30

Draw 8
16:30

Wednesday, September 18
Draw 10
8:30

Draw 12
16:30

Thursday, September 19
Draw 14
10:00

Draw 16
19:00

Blue Group

Monday, September 16
Draw 3
12:30

Draw 5
20:30

Tuesday, September 17
Draw 7
12:30

Draw 9
20:30

Wednesday, September 18
Draw 11
12:30

Draw 13
20:30

Thursday, September 19
Draw 15
14:30

Yellow Group

Sunday, September 15
Draw 1
21:00

Monday, September 16
Draw 2
8:30

Draw 3
12:30

Draw 4
16:30

Draw 5
20:30

Tuesday, September 17
Draw 6
8:30

Draw 8
16:30

Draw 9
20:30

Wednesday, September 18
Draw 10
8:30

Draw 11
12:30

Draw 12
16:30

Draw 13
20:30

Thursday, September 19
Draw 14
10:00

Draw 15
14:30

Draw 16
19:00

Tiebreaker
Saturday, September 20, 10:00

Playoffs

Qualification Game
Friday, September 20, 14:30

Quarterfinals
Friday, September 20, 19:00

Semifinals
Saturday, September 21, 10:00

Bronze medal game
Saturday, September 21, 15:00

Gold medal game
Saturday, September 21, 15:00

References

External links

European Mixed Curling Championship
2013 in curling
International sports competitions in Edinburgh
International curling competitions hosted by Scotland
2013 in Scottish sport
September 2013 sports events in the United Kingdom
2010s in Edinburgh